In the United States, sports are televised on various broadcast networks, national and specialty sports cable channels, and regional sports networks. U.S. sports rights are estimated to be worth a total of $22.42 billion in 2019, about 44 percent of the total worldwide sports media market. U.S. networks are willing to pay a significant amount of money for television sports contracts because it attracts large amounts of viewership; live sport broadcasts accounted for 44 of the 50 list of most watched television broadcasts in the United States in 2016.

Among these television contracts, NBC holds a $7.75 billion contract, signed in 2014, to air the Olympic Games through the 2032 games, making it a major source of revenue for the International Olympic Committee. The broadcast deals of the National Collegiate Athletic Association (NCAA), running through 2032 (and including its most significant property, the NCAA Division I men's basketball tournament — colloquially known as "March Madness"), were worth $8.8 billion in 2018.

The U.S. is home to four of the top six list of professional sports leagues by revenue in the world: Major League Baseball (MLB), National Basketball Association (NBA), National Football League (NFL), and National Hockey League (NHL). The NFL has the largest television contracts, and earns over $6 billion annually from its contracts with Fox, CBS, NBC, ESPN and DirecTV for the 2014 through 2022 seasons. MLB earns $1.5 billion annually from its contracts signed in 2012 with ESPN, Fox, and Turner Sports (TBS) for the 2014 through 2021 seasons. In 2014, the NBA signed a nine-year television deal with ABC/ESPN and TNT that generates annual league television revenues of $2.66 billion beginning with the 2016–17 season, while the NHL earns $625 million annually from seven-year contracts signed in 2021 with ESPN and Turner Sports to last until the 2027–28 season.

American football

National Football League

Since the 1960s, all regular season and playoff games broadcast in the United States have been aired by national television networks. Until the broadcast contract ended in 2013, the terrestrial television networks CBS, NBC, and Fox, as well as cable television's ESPN, paid a combined total of US$20.4 billion to broadcast NFL games. From 2014 to 2022, the same networks will pay $39.6 billion for exactly the same broadcast rights. The NFL thus holds broadcast contracts with four companies (Paramount Global, Comcast, Fox Corporation, and ESPN Inc.—which is majority owned by The Walt Disney Company, respectively) that control a combined media cross-ownership in the United States. League-owned NFL Network, on cable television, also broadcasts a selected number of games nationally. In 2017, the NFL games attracted the top three rates for a 30-second advertisement: $699,602 for NBC Sunday Night Football, $550,709 for Thursday Night Football (NBC), and $549,791 for Thursday Night Football (CBS).

For the 2020 NFL season, two extra wild card playoff games are being added to the schedule; CBS and NBC acquired rights to these new games, with both paying roughly $70 million each.

Television

Digital and out-of-market

Radio 
Westwood One has exclusive national radio rights through an unspecified multi-year period starting in the 2022 season. , Westwood One airs coverage of nationally telecast primetime games, as well as all playoff games and other NFL events.

Compass Media Networks, ESPN Radio, and the Sports USA Radio Network have national radio rights to regular season Sunday afternoon games sublicensed from Dial Global.

Each NFL team has local television stations with rights to preseason games and radio stations with rights to all games.
Sirius XM has exclusive satellite radio rights to home, away, and, if available, national broadcast radio feeds of all games. It also has rights to online streaming of games for its subscribers starting with the 2011 season.

College football

College football coverage is dependent on negotiations between the broadcaster and the college football conference or team.  The televised games may change from year-to-year depending on which teams are having a strong season, although some traditional college rivalry games are broadcast each year. Some games are traditionally associated with a specific event or holiday, and viewing the game itself can become a holiday tradition for fans.

Post-season bowl games, including the College Football Playoff, are presently all televised, most of them by the ESPN networks. The television broadcast rights to all six CFP bowls and the National Championship are owned by ESPN through at least the 2025 season. In November 2012, ESPN reached a 12-year deal to broadcast the remaining three bowls, the championship game, as well as shoulder programming such as ranking shows; as a whole, the contract is valued at around $470 million per year, or nearly $5.7 billion for the life of the contract.

Regular-season
Army and Navy home games and the Army–Navy Game: CBS and CBS Sports Network, ESPN networks (One Navy home game plus the game when Navy plays Notre Dame at home)
Atlantic Coast Conference: ABC, ESPN networks, ACC Network
American Athletic Conference: ABC, ESPN networks, ESPN+, CBS Sports Network
AAC Championship Game: ABC
BYU home games: ABC, BYUtv (one home game), ESPN networks
Big Ten Conference: Fox Sports, NBC Sports, CBS Sports, Big Ten Network
Big Ten Championship Game: Fox, CBS, NBC
Big 12 Conference: ABC, ESPN networks (at least one Longhorns home game exclusively on Longhorn Network), Big 12 Now on ESPN+, Fox Sports
Big 12 Championship Game: ESPN/ABC 
Conference USA: CBS Sports Network, ESPN Networks, Stadium, Facebook Watch (via CBS and/or Stadium)
Conference USA Football Championship Game: CBS Sports Network
Mountain West Conference: Fox Sports, CBS, CBS Sports Network, Mountain West Network
Notre Dame: NBC
Pac-12 Conference: ABC, ESPN networks, Fox Sports, Pac-12 Network
Pac-12 Football Championship Game: Fox (in even years), ESPN/ABC (in odd years)
SEC: SEC on CBS (Ends 2024), ESPN networks, SEC Network
Sun Belt Conference: ESPN networks, NFL Network
Mid-American Conference: ESPN networks, NFL Network
Ivy League: ESPN Networks
Southwestern Athletic Conference: ESPN Networks, HBCU Go

Post-season
All bowl games, including the College Football Playoff "New Year's Six" (Rose Bowl Game, Orange Bowl, Sugar Bowl, Peach Bowl, Cotton Bowl Classic, Fiesta Bowl) and College Football Playoff National Championship, air on ESPN networks unless otherwise noted.
CBS: Sun Bowl (1968–present)
Fox: Holiday Bowl (2017, 2022–present)
Barstool Sports: Arizona Bowl (2022–present)
NCAA Division I (FCS) Football Championship: ESPN networks (television), WestwoodOne (radio)
NCAA Division II Football Championship game: ESPN2
NCAA Division III Football Championship game: ESPNU

Radio
ESPN Radio: Army Black Knights football and Navy Midshipmen football (national rights)
IMG College: Notre Dame Fighting Irish football (national rights), regional rights to numerous other teams as well as Big East and Southeastern Conference games of the week
JMI Sports: regional rights to University of Kentucky sports, including Kentucky Wildcats football, from 2015 to 2030
Learfield Sports: regional rights to numerous teams
Nevada Sports Network: 3 bowl games a year
Sports USA Radio Network, Westwood One, Compass Media Networks, ESPN Radio, and Touchdown Radio Productions/United Stations Radio Networks: national games

CFL 

Since 2013, ESPN's networks have held rights to the Canadian Football League; the league's domestic rights are held by The Sports Network, a Canadian sports channel that ESPN holds a minority ownership stake in. This agreement was renewed in 2014 for five years, aligned with TSN's domestic contract, with a stipulation that at least 17 games would be carried on an ESPN linear network each season (primarily ESPN2), including the Grey Cup. Originally ESPN3 carried all games not carried on one of the linear channels online, later ESPN moved those games to ESPN+.

Sirius XM Canada's radio broadcasts of the CFL are available in the United States.

XFL

The new incarnation of the XFL divided its broadcast rights between ESPN on ABC/ESPN and Fox Sports under a three-year deal. XFL games were split among ABC, Fox, ESPN, and Fox Sports 1 (with a small number of games scheduled for ESPN2 and Fox Sports 2). ESPN was to air the championship game. The Wall Street Journal reported via inside sources that neither the broadcasters or the league made any upfront payments, but that the XFL sold the in-game sponsorship inventory. The networks covered the production costs, held the digital rights to their telecasts, and the right to sell the conventional commercial inventory during their games.

The league filed for bankruptcy and folded when the first season was cut short due to the COVID-19 pandemic. However, during the bankruptcy process, Fox expressed interest in broadcasting games if new owners could revive the league.  The league was sold to a group headed by actor Dwayne Johnson for $15 million.

 ESPN: ABC, ESPN, FX, ESPN+

Baseball

Major League Baseball
National television

On August 28, 2012, it was announced that ESPN and Major League Baseball had agreed on a new eight-year deal that greatly increases the network's studio and game content across all of its platforms. Also it increased ESPN's average yearly payment from about $360 million to approximately $700 million. ESPN also returned to broadcasting postseason baseball beginning in 2014 with one of two wild-card games each season. The network alternates airing the American League and National League wild-card games each year. It also has the rights to all potential regular-season tiebreaker games starting in 2014.

On September 19, 2012, Sports Business Daily reported that Major League Baseball would agree to separate eight-year television deals with Fox Sports and Turner Sports through the 2021 season. Fox would reportedly pay around $4 billion over eight years (close to $500 million per year) while Turner would pay around $2.8 billion over eight years (more than $300 million per year). Under the new deals, Fox and TBS's coverage would essentially be the same as in the 2007–2013 contract with the exception of Fox and TBS splitting coverage of the Division Series, which TBS has broadcast exclusively dating back to 2007. More importantly, Fox would carry some of the games (such as the Saturday afternoon Game of the Week) on its all-sports channel, Fox Sports 1. Sources also said that was possible that Fox would sell some Division Series games to MLB Network, which did end up occurring.

On November 15, 2018, Fox renewed its rights, set to end in 2022, through 2028. The contract maintains Fox's current coverage structure, but with expanded digital rights, and the commitment to air more games on the Fox broadcast network when the new deal takes effect. Fox also committed to airing at least two of its League Championship Series games, as well as any Game 7, on the broadcast network beginning in 2019; it had been criticized for airing only Game 2 of the 2018 National League Championship Series, while placing the rest on Fox Sports 1.

On September 24, 2020, TBS also renewed its rights from 2022 through 2028, under which it will replace its late-season Sunday afternoon games with a season-long package of primetime games on Tuesday nights, and maintain its existing arrangements for playoff coverage. The contract also adds expanded digital rights for Bleacher Report and "additional WarnerMedia platforms". ESPN would in turn renew its rights to MLB on May 13, 2021, for the 2022 to 2028 seasons; the deal ends ESPN's coverage of weeknight games, but retains its exclusive Sunday night window and playoff telecasts.
On March 8, 2022, Apple Inc. signed a seven-year deal with MLB for the broadcast for US$85 million per year, a total value of $595 million. This includes an annual $55 million rights fee as well as $30 million for Apple advertising. Apple has the right to exit the agreement after the first or second year.
On April 9, 2022, NBC Sports announced an agreement with MLB for a package of new Sunday afternoon games starting from 2022 season; those matches are broadcast exclusively on Peacock.

Fox/FS1: 52 Saturday afternoon games; two Division Series; one League Championship Series; All-Star Game; World Series.
TBS: Tuesday night games throughout the season. Postseason coverage consists of two Division Series; and one League Championship Series. TNT serves as an overflow channel.
ESPN: 30 regular-season games annually. This include Sunday Night Baseball, the Little League Classic and the national Opening Night telecast. In addition, will continue to carry the Home Run Derby and can televise up to 10 Spring Training games. ESPN will have the rights to exclusively broadcast all MLB Wild Card Series starting in 2022. ESPN+ will continue to televise select MLB games, subject to blackout restrictions, nearly every day of the regular season.
MLB Network: Airs 26 non-exclusive MLB Network Showcase games, and Spanish coverage of TBS's playoff coverage. The channel also carries various other games simulcast from local broadcasters.
Apple TV+: 24 Friday night regular-season games annually until 2029.
Peacock: 18 Sunday afternoon regular-season games annually.

Local television

Additionally, local or regional broadcasters contract with the MLB team in their area for the right to broadcast a number of regular season games locally, primarily on regional sports networks. Games broadcast locally or regionally are available nationwide (except those affected by local blackout restrictions) on the subscription-based MLB.com and MLB Extra Innings services.

National radio
ESPN Radio: a Saturday game of the week, Sunday night, opening day and holiday games, plus the All-Star Game and the entire postseason.
TUDN Radio: Spanish-language coverage of select regular season games, the Home Run Derby, the All-Star Game, and the postseason.

Local radio
MLB teams also contract with local broadcasters to air games on radio. Several teams have multiple affiliates covering those games. The flagship stations can air all games of the teams they contract with, other affiliates must allow ESPN radio coverage to air during the postseason.

Caribbean Series
ESPN Deportes has Spanish-language TV and radio rights to the Caribbean Series.

College Baseball
Post-season
ESPN currently broadcasts the College World Series on its family of networks.

Regular-season
Nationally televised regular-season games are contracted through each conference and appear on BeIN Sports, CBS Sports Network, ESPN/ESPN2/ESPNU, FS1, Fox Sports regional networks, Fox College Sports, including several school- and conference-specific networks (Big Ten Network, SEC Network, BYU TV, Pac-12 Network, and Longhorn Network).

Little League Baseball
ESPN has rights to broadcast the entire Little League World Series, as well as the finals of the eight regional tournaments that determine the U.S. representatives in that competition. It distributes coverage among its family of networks and ABC; the final is aired on ABC.

Softball
 NCAA Division I softball tournament: ESPN
 World Cup of Softball: ESPN

Minor League Baseball
Minor League Baseball has a contract with Stadium to air two games each week.

Nippon Professional Baseball
Yomiuri Giants: Eleven Sports
Pacific League: Eleven Sports
Other limited coverage is part of the weekend schedule of TV Japan

Other baseball leagues 

 KBO: Select games on ESPN
 ABL: All games on YouTube page and select games on Eleven Sports and FuboTV
 Constellation Energy League: FuboTV
 CanAM: Select games on Eleven Sports

Basketball

National Basketball Association

National television

On October 6, 2014, NBA announced a nine-year $24 billion ($2.7 billion/year) extension with ESPN, ABC and Turner Sports beginning with the 2016–17 NBA season and running through the 2024–25 season – the second most expensive media rights in the world after NFL and on a par with English football on television in annual rights fee from 2016–17 Premier League to 2018–19 season.

 ABC: 19 regular-season games (Christmas Day double or triple header, and late-season games on Saturday nights and Sunday afternoons); some first- and second-round playoff games (mostly on weekend afternoons); NBA Finals through 2025
 ESPN: 82 regular-season games (mostly on Wednesday and Friday night doubleheaders; occasional Sunday and Monday night games); up to 30 playoff games during the first two rounds conference semi-final games and one of the conference finals per-season through 2025.
 TNT: 67 regular-season games (mostly on Tuesday night doubleheaders); All-Star Weekend; up to 45 playoff games during the first two rounds; conference semi-final games and one of the conference finals per-season through 2025
 NBA TV: 106 regular-season games on Sunday, Monday, Thursday and Saturday night and up to 9 postseason games through 2025

Local television
Additionally, local or regional broadcasters contract with the NBA team in their area for the right to broadcast a number of regular-season games locally. These broadcasters can be traditional over-the-air television stations as well as regional cable sports channels. WGN-TV, then a Chicago-based superstation, broadcast a limited number of Chicago Bulls regular season games on WGN America until 2014, fewer than they provided locally. If ESPN chooses to opt out of airing all of the games on their night, NBA TV airs a game in its place. Games in the first round of the playoffs can be aired by regional broadcasters, unless the national broadcaster has exclusive rights. Games in the first round not selected by national broadcasters are usually broadcast by NBA TV.

National radio
 ESPN Radio: usually one game from the Sunday afternoon package, one game on Thursday night, and postseason coverage including all games in the Conference Finals and the NBA Finals

Local radio
NBA teams also contract with local radio broadcasters to air their games. Teams may also have affiliates air their games.

Women's National Basketball Association
In 2013, the WNBA and ESPN signed a six-year extension on the broadcast deal to cover 2017–2022. In the new deal, a total of 30 games would be shown each season on ESPN networks. Each team would receive around $1 million per year.

On April 22, 2019, CBS Sports Network reached a multi-year deal to televise 40 regular-season weekend and primetime WNBA games, beginning in the 2019 WNBA season.

ESPN/ABC: select weeknight games, All Star Game, playoffs and WNBA Finals. Provisional coverage on ABC through 2025. 
NBA TV: select games throughout the week.
CBS Sports Network: select games on weekends.

College basketball

Postseason
 NCAA Division I men's basketball tournament: From 2011 through 2032, all games are televised by either CBS or a Warner Bros. Discovery cable network (TBS, TNT, and TruTV)
The First Four round is televised exclusively by TruTV. 
Since 2016, WarnerMedia networks broadcast the Final Four and national championship games in even-numbered years, and CBS in odd-numbered years. During years in which the Final Four is televised by WarnerMedia, TBS carries the conventional telecast, while TNT and TruTV carry special "Team Stream" telecasts with commentary and surrounding coverage focused on each of the participating teams.
 NIT and NIT Season Tip-Off: ESPN
 NCAA Division I women's basketball tournament: ESPN
 NAIA Men's Basketball Championships: ESPN3

Regular season
Nationally televised regular-season games are contracted through each conference and air as follows:
America East: ESPN networks
American Athletic Conference: ESPN networks, ABC, CBS
Atlantic 10: ESPN networks, CBSSN, CBS (championship only), NBC Sports
ACC: ESPN networks, ABC, ACC Network, ACC on Regional Sports Networks
ASUN: ESPN networks
Big 12: ESPN networks, CBS
Big East: FOX, FS1, CBS, CBSSN
Big Sky Conference: ESPN networks 
Big South Conference: ESPN networks 
Big Ten: NBC, Peacock, FOX, FS1, CBS, Paramount+, Big Ten Network
Big West: ESPN networks, Spectrum SportsNet
Conference USA: ESPN Networks, CBSSN, Stadium, CUSA.tv
Colonial Athletic Association: CBSSN, FloHoops
Horizon League: ESPN networks
Ivy League: ESPN networks 
MAAC: ESPN networks 
Mid-American Conference: ESPN networks, CBSSN
MEAC: ESPN networks
Missouri Valley Conference: ESPN+, CBSSN, CBS (championship only), MVC Network
Mountain West Conference: FOX, FS1, CBS, CBSSN, Stadium, Mountain West Network
Northeast Conference: ESPN networks, NEC Front Row, SNY, CBS Sports Network
Ohio Valley Conference: ESPN networks 
Pac-12 Conference: ESPN networks, ABC, FOX, FS1, CBS, Pac-12 Network
Patriot League: ESPN networks, CBSSN
SEC: ESPN networks, CBS, SEC Network
Southwestern Athletic Conference: ESPN networks, HBCU Go, TheGrio
Southern Conference: ESPN networks, CBSSN
Southland Conference: ESPN networks
Summit League: ESPN networks, MidcoSN
Sun Belt Conference: ESPN networks
Western Athletic Conference: ESPN networks 
West Coast Conference: ESPN networks, CBSSN, WCC Network

FIBA
 FIBA Basketball World Cup: ESPN (including qualifiers)
 FIBA Under-19 Basketball World Cup (men and women): ESPN
FIBA Intercontinental Cup: Facebook, YouTube, and Twitch
FIBA 3x3 World Tour: FloSports
 EuroBasket (men and women): ESPN
 FIBA AmeriCup and FIBA Women's AmeriCup: ESPN
 AfroBasket (men and women): ESPN

Other leagues
NBA Summer League: ESPN and NBA TV
NBA G League: ESPN and NBA TV 
The Basketball Tournament: ESPN
Big3: CBS, CBS Sports Network
ABA Basketball: ESPN3
Premier Basketball League: ESPN3
Euroleague and EuroCup: FloSports
Basketball Bundesliga: Fanseat
Liga ACB: Eleven Sports Network
NBL: FanDuel TV
NZNBL : ESPN
Israeli Super League: Fubo Sports Network

Boxing
 Bare Knuckle Fighting Championship: FITE+
 Golden Boy Promotions: DAZN
 Dream Boxing:  DAZN
 Matchroom Sport: DAZN
 Premier Boxing Champions: Fox/FS1 (English); Fox Deportes (Spanish); Showtime
 Top Rank: ESPN and ESPN+

Cricket

 International competitions

Cricket World Cup: Willow
ICC Men's T20 World Cup: ESPN+, Willow
Under-19 Cricket World Cup: ESPN+, Willow
Australia national cricket team: Willow
Bangladesh national cricket team: Willow
England national cricket team: Willow
India national cricket team: ESPN+ Hotstar
Ireland cricket team: ESPN+
New Zealand national cricket team: ESPN+
West Indies cricket team: ESPN+
Pakistan national cricket team: Willow
South Africa national cricket team: Willow
Sri Lanka national cricket team: Willow

 National competitions

Big Bash League: Willow
Bangladesh Premier League: Willow
Caribbean Premier League: Willow
Pakistan Super League: Willow
Indian Premier League: Willow, Hotstar
Super Smash: ESPN+
Regional Super50: ESPN+
Major League Cricket: Willow TV

Curling

More than 300 hours of live curling, broadcast by TSN in Canada, will be live-streamed on ESPN3, including:	
Canada Cup
TSN All-Star Curling Skins Game
Continental Cup
Canadian Junior Men's and Women's Championships	
Scotties Tournament of Hearts
Tim Hortons Brier

Cycling

 Grand Tours

Tour de France (until 2029): USA Network, Peacock, (NBC shows a weekly one-hour recap)
Tour de France Femmes: Peacock
Vuelta a España: Peacock
Giro d'Italia: GCN+

 Other road cycling races

Paris-Roubaix, Flèche Wallonne, Liège–Bastogne–Liège, Critérium du Dauphiné, Paris-Tours: Peacock
Tirreno–Adriatico, Milan–San Remo, Strade Bianche, Tour of Britain, Volta a Catalunya: GCN+
Other RCS races: GCN+
Tour of Flanders and other Flanders Classics races: Flo Sports
Amstel Gold Race: Flo Sports
Tour de Suisse: Flo Sports
UCI Road World Championships: Flo Sports

Esports

Blast Pro Series: Eleven Sports Network
ELeague: TBS
eNASCAR Coke-Cola iRacing Series: all events on YouTube and Twitch with select events on NBCSN 
League of Legends Championship Series: ESPN+
Madden NFL: ESPN
Madden Bowl: ESPN
Overwatch League: YouTube

Golf

Men's majors

Women's majors

Tours and other events

Ice hockey

National Hockey League

As of the 2021–22 NHL season, the national media rights of the National Hockey League (NHL) are divided between ESPN and Turner Sports under seven-year contracts;

Local or regional broadcasters contract with the NHL team in their area for the right to broadcast several regular-season games locally.

Radio

Sports USA Radio airs selected regular season and postseason games, including the entire Stanley Cup Finals. NHL teams also contract with local radio broadcasters to air game; games are also simulcast from local radio feeds on the Sirius XM satellite radio platform.

Premier Hockey Federation
The Premier Hockey Federation (PHF; formerly the National Women's Hockey League) has primarily partnered with streaming outlets, which have in the past included ESPN3, Cheddar, and Twitter. In 2019, the league signed with Twitch to stream games and ancillary content, in its first contract to ever include a rights fee.

NBCSN was to televise the league's 2021 semi-final and finals in the NWHL's first linear rights deal.

The NWHL had also reached an agreement with NBCSN to carry the 2021 Isobel Cup semi-finals and finals, which would marked the first NWHL games to be broadcast nationally on a linear television channel.

For 2021–22 season, The PHF, will stream 60 regular season games, special events and its Isobel Cup Playoffs exclusively on ESPN+ in the U.S.

Southern Professional Hockey League
America One: Regular season, playoffs and Championships through 2014

College hockey

Regular season games air locally, often via regional sports networks (such as Bally Sports) and networks contracted with conferences, these conferences include:

Big Ten Conference: Big Ten Network, ESPNU
Hockey East: ESPN Networks
NCHC: CBS Sports Network
Notre Dame: NBC Sports 
NCAA Men's Ice Hockey Championship: ESPNU (regional semi-finals and finals), ESPN2 (national semi-finals), ESPN (national championship), and Westwood One (radio)

Other ice hockey leagues
Ice Hockey World Championships: NHL Network and ESPN+
IIHF World U20 Championship: NHL Network and ESPN+
Memorial Cup (Canada): NHL Network
American Hockey League: select games on NHL Network, select regional coverage by local broadcasters, All-Star Game and Skills Competition on regional sports networks
Kontinental Hockey League: ESPN+
Swedish Hockey League: Next Level Sports
Australian Ice Hockey League: YouTube

Horse racing
NBC holds the rights to all three races in the Triple Crown, including the Kentucky Derby through 2025, the Preakness Stakes through 2022, and the Belmont Stakes through 2022. USA Network provides supplementary coverage of all three Triple Crown races, including previews and associated undercard races on Fridays preceding the Saturday races (including the Kentucky Oaks, Black-Eyed Susan Stakes, and Brooklyn Invitational Stakes). NBC also carries coverage of the Road to the Kentucky Derby series, including the Florida Derby, Santa Anita Derby and Blue Grass Stakes races.

NBC and USA Network also carry the Breeders' Cup since 2022, with USA Network carrying most of the coverage, and the Breeders' Cup Classic airing on the main network.

Lacrosse

Major League Lacrosse

ESPN+ and Lax Sports Network

Women's Professional Lacrosse League
ESPN

National Lacrosse League

ESPN+

Premier Lacrosse League

ESPN: 3 games including championship game live on ABC, 3 games on ESPN, 6 games on ESPN2, and every game on ESPN+.

College Lacrosse
Varsity lacrosse
NCAA Men's Lacrosse Championship: First round and Quarterfinal matches on ESPNU or ESPNews, Semi-finals on ESPN2, Final on ESPN. Effective with the 2011 tournament, internet streaming on Turner Sports (possibly through its administration of the official NCAA sports website).
CBS Sports Network: NCAA Men's Lacrosse Championship and NCAA Division I Women's Lacrosse Championship. Streaming on Turner (again, possibly through NCAA.com).
Nationally televised regular-season games appear on CBS Sports Network, Fox College Sports and ESPNU.

Club Lacrosse
Men's Collegiate Lacrosse Association: Semi-finals and Championship of both division 1 and 2 broadcast nationally on Fox College Sports, usually the Pacific affiliate. Championships also simulcast on the MCLA website.
BYU TV: At least one home MCLA game featuring BYU, but BYUtv Sports has rights to all home games.

International Lacrosse
ESPN2 & ESPN+: FIL World Lacrosse Championship

Kickboxing

King of Kings: DAZN: October 2022 to October 2025, all fights

Mixed martial arts
 Ultimate Fighting Championship: ESPN, ESPN+ and ESPN Deportes
 Bellator MMA: Showtime
 Bushido MMA: DAZN
 Professional Fighters League: ESPN
 ONE Championship: Prime Video
 Legend FC: NBC Sports

Motor sports

NASCAR

Fox Sports and NBC Sports have contracts for all NASCAR events through at least 2024. On October 15, 2012, NASCAR and the Fox Sports Media Group (FSMG) announced a new $2.4 billion eight-year deal, a 30% increase from their previous deal. On July 23, 2013, NASCAR and the NBC Sports Group announced a new $4.4 billion ten-year deal. Ten days later on August 1, 2013, NASCAR and Fox extended and expanded their agreement, paying an additional $1.4 billion to do so, to complete NASCAR's new TV package through the 2024 season.

NASCAR Cup Series
Fox Sports airs the first 16 races.
Fox airs ten races, including the Daytona 500 and Coca-Cola 600, plus the Busch Light Clash.
Fox Sports 1 airs six races, plus the Bluegreen Vacations Duel, and NASCAR All-Star Race.
Fox Deportes airs multiple races in Spanish.
NBC Sports airs the final 20 races.
NBC airs ten races, including the Coke Zero Sugar 400 and the Championship Race.
USA Network airs ten races. Some races may air on CNBC if there is a sports conflict.
Telemundo Deportes airs multiple races in Spanish on Universo.
NASCAR Xfinity Series
Fox Sports airs the first 14 races.
Fox airs one race; Fox Sports 1 (Fox Sports 2 if there is a sports conflict) airs thirteen races.
NBC Sports airs the final 19 races.
NBC airs four races; USA (CNBC if there is a sports conflict) airs fifteen races.
NASCAR Camping World Truck Series
Fox Sports 1 (or if there is a sports conflict, Fox Sports 2 or Fox Business) airs all races.
Other series
ARCA Menards Series
All races air on Fox Sports 1 or 2. FloRacing also airs 10 races.
ARCA Menard Series East and West
FloRacing airs all standalone events live and they will air later in a 45 min highlight on USA.
MavTV and FloRacing simultaneously air eleven races, including three combination races.
NASCAR Whelen Modified Tour
FloRacing airs all races with select events later shown in a 45 min highlight on USA.
NASCAR Advance Auto Parts Weekly Series
FloRacing airs select NASCAR Roots events throughout the country including weekly racing at Bowman Gray Stadium, New Smyrna Speedway, and Berlin Raceway.
NASCAR Pinty's Series
FloRacing airs all events.
All NASCAR Whelen Euro Series events are shown live on YouTube.

IndyCar
 NTT IndyCar Series
 NBC Sports (NBC, USA, and Telemundo Deportes) has a contract through 2024 in English and Spanish. Coverage is as follows:
 NBC Sports airs the Indianapolis 500, 12 other races (13 in 2022), and time trials for the Indianapolis 500.
 USA Network or (rarely, in the event of schedule conflicts) CNBC air the remaining races.
 Peacock exclusively streams 1 race, while simulcasting all the races on NBC and USA
 Indy Lights
 NBC Sports (Peacock)
 Indy Pro 2000 Championship
 RoadToIndy.TV will stream all sessions for Indy Pro 2000 in 2019
 U.S. F2000 National Championship
 RoadToIndy.TV will stream all sessions for USF2000 in 2019

Formula One
ESPN aired Formula One from 1984 to 1997. Speed and Fox Sports Net shared broadcasting rights from 1998 to 2000. Speedvision and its successor Speed Channel continued to broadcast the championship until 2012. Fox aired select races from 2007 to 2012. NBC Sports had English-language TV broadcasting rights from 2013 through 2017. Races were televised by NBC, NBCSN or CNBC and streamed on NBC Sports Live Extra.

ESPN became the new broadcaster in 2018. The network unveiled plans to show over 100 hours of F1 programming during their first season returning to the sport. This included plans to show every practice and qualifying session in some capacity. Race broadcasts would be spread across ESPN and ESPN2 with plans to show live coverage of Canada GP, the American and Mexican Grand Prix live on ABC while also showing the Monaco Grand Prix on tape-delay. March 1 of that year they announced the launch of their own Over-the-top media service service called F1 TV Pro what show races live and on-demand.

ESPN Deportes has the current Spanish-language rights.

IMSA
 WeatherTech SportsCar Championship
NBC Sports feature full season coverage across NBC, USA Network and Peacock
 Michelin Pilot Challenge
Peacock
 IMSA Prototype Challenge
Peacock
 Lamborghini Super Trofeo
 Select races will feature live streaming coverage on IMSA.tv
 IMSA GT3 Cup Challenge presented by Yokohama
 Select races will feature live streaming coverage on IMSA.tv
 IMSA GT3 Cup Challenge Canada
 Select races will feature live streaming coverage on IMSA.tv

Motorcycle racing

SuperMotocross World Championship
Includes the AMA Supercross Championship and AMA Motocross Championship.
NBC: Eight races, of which six are live
USA: Six races, of which four are live
Peacock: Every race live
CNBC: Every race on next day delay

Other Motorcycle Racing
American Flat Track: Fox Sports 1, Fox Sports 2
FIM MotoGP World Championship: NBC Sports (5 races live, other races shown delayed) 
Motocross World Championship: CBS Sports Network
Superbike World Championship: NBC Sports (6 races shown delayed) 
KICKER Arenacross: Ryde TV (live), CBS Sports Network (delayed)
MotoAmerica: Fox Sports 1, Fox Sports 2, MavTV

Drag racing
ANDRA Drag Racing: MavTV / MavTV Plus (delay)
400 Thunder Drag Racing Series: MavTV / MavTV Plus (delay)
Lucas Oil Drag Boat Racing Series: MavTV / MavTV Plus (delay)
NHRA E3 Spark Plugs Pro Mod Series: Fox Sports
NHRA Lucas Oil Sportsman Series: Fox Sports
NHRA Mello Yello Drag Racing Series: Fox Sports – full season / select races with live coverage

Short track racing
All Star Circuit of Champions: FloRacing (live)
American Canadian Tour: Speed51.com (Select Live events)
ARCA/CRA Super Series: Speed51.com
ARCA Midwest Tour: Speed51.com
CARS Tour: SpeedSport.tv and Carstour.tv (live)
Eldora Speedway events: FloRacing (live) *non World of Outlaws and NASCAR events
Granite State Pro Stock Series: Speed51.com (live)
FASTRAK Racing Series: Speed51.com (live)
Knoxville Raceway events: DIRTvision.com
INEX Legends Car Racing: Legendsnatition.tv (live – select races)
Lucas Oil ASCS National Tour: MAVTV (delayed), MAVTV Plus (live), RacinBoys (live) FloRacing (live)
Chili Bowl: MAVTV / MAVTV Plus (Saturday features), FloRacing (prelim nights)
Lucas Oil Late Model Dirt Series: MAVTV (live / delayed), CBS Sports (delayed), MAVTV Plus (live)
Lucas Oil Speedway: MAVTV / MAVTV Plus
NARC King of the West 410 Sprints: FloRacing (live)
PA Speedweek: FloRacing (live), SprintCarUnlimited TV (live)
POWRI Lucas Oil National Midgets: MavTV (delayed), MAVTV Plus (live)
POWRI Lucas Oil BCRA Midget Series: MAVTV (delayed – Madera)
SRL Southwest Tour: MAVTV (delayed), MavTV Plus (live), Speed51.com (live)
Super DIRTcar Series: FloRacing (live), select races on MAVTV (delayed)
Sprint Car Challenge Tour: FloRacing (live)
Snowball Derby: Speed51.com (live)
Southeast Super Truck: SpeedSport.tv (live)
Southeast Legends Tour: Legendsnatition.tv (live)
Summer Shootout: MAVTV / MavTV Plus (delay)
USAC SIlver Crown Champ Car Series: FloRacing
USAC AMSOIL National Sprint Car Championship: FloRacing
USAC NOS Energy National Midget Championship: FloRacing
ULTIMATE Series: Speed51.com (Select Live events)
World of Outlaws Morton Buildings Late Models: DIRTvision.com (live), CBS Sports Network (delayed – select races)
World of Outlaws NOS Energy Sprint Cars: DIRTvision.com (live), CBS Sports Network (delayed – select races)
William Grove Speedway events: DIRTvision.com

Off-road racing
AMSOIL Snocross: CBS Sports Network
Dakar Rally: Peacock, CNBC
Nitro Rallycross: Peacock
FIA World Rally Championship Live on WRC+ and day highlights on Red Bull TV
FIA World Rallycross Championship (WRX): Motor Trend on Demand (live), CBS Sports Network (tape-delayed)

Other
ABB FIA Formula E Championship: CBS Sports
Andros Trophy: Motor Trend on Demand 
GT World Challenge America: CBS Sports Network – full season tape delay, live streaming on Motor Trend on Demand and series website
GT World Challenge Asia: CBS Sports Network – full season tape delay, live streaming on Motor Trend on Demand and series website
GT World Challenge Europe: CBS Sports Network – full season tape delay, live streaming on Motor Trend on Demand and series website
Deutsche Tourenwagen Masters: CBS Sports Network  live streaming on Motor Trend on Demand 
European Le Mans Series: ELMS YouTube page
FIA Formula 2: ESPN3 and F1TV Pro
FIA Formula 3: ESPN+ and F1TV Pro
FIA World Endurance Championship / 24 Hours of Le Mans: Motor Trend and Motor Trend on Demand
Ferrari Challenge: Ferrari YouTube page and Motor Trend on Demand
GT Open: GT Open YouTube page
Intercontinental GT Challenge: CBS Sports Network (select rounds) also live streaming on Motor Trend on Demand and series website
Lucas Oil Pro Pulling League: MavTV (delayed), MavTV Plus (select events live)
GT World Challenge America: CBS Sports Network (tape delay), live streaming on series website 
Porsche Supercup: ESPN+ and F1TV Pro
Race of Champions: CBS Sports Network (tape delayed), Motor Trend on Demand (live streaming)
Shannons Nationals Motor Racing Championships: MavTV (tape delayed)
Super GT: Motorsport.tv
Supercars Championship: Live streaming races and qualifying on Motor Trend on Demand and Practice on YouTube
Superstar Racing Experience: ESPN
GT World Challenge America: CBS Sports Network (tape delayed), live streaming on series website 
Nürburgring Langstrecken Serie: Nürburgring and The Race YouTube page and motorsport.tv (Same for the 24 Hour Nürburgring)
W Series: ESPN
24H Series: 24H Series YouTube page

Multi-discipline events
Olympic Games: NBCUniversal (NBC, USA Network, MSNBC, CNBC, Bravo, Golf Channel, Telemundo, Universo) has rights to the Summer and Winter Olympic Games through 2032.
NBC has held the American broadcasting rights to the Summer Olympic Games since the 1988 games and the rights to the Winter Olympic Games since the 2002 games. In 2011, NBC agreed to a $4.38 billion contract with the International Olympic Committee to broadcast the Olympics through the 2020 games, the most expensive television rights deal in Olympic history. NBC then agreed to a $7.75 billion contract extension on May 7, 2014, to air the Olympics through the 2032 games. NBC is one of the major sources of revenue for the IOC.
Pan American Games: ESPN and ESPN Deportes through 2019.
Central American and Caribbean Games: ESPN Deportes and ESPN3
Commonwealth Games: ESPN3
Special Olympics World Games: ESPN
Invictus Games: ESPN3
 Aurora Games: ESPN
 Universiade: TBA

Rugby league

 National Rugby League: 
Bally Sports: holds the rights to three matches for each round of the regular season, and for all games part of the Finals Series, including the Grand Final. 
WatchNRL:  shows every match of the season, including the Finals Series and Grand Final.
 State of Origin series: 
Fox Sports 2: televises all three games of the series.
WatchNRL:  shows all three games of the series.
 Super League and Challenge Cup: 
Fox Soccer Plus airs all televised Super League matches, select matches from the RFL Championship and all televised Challenge Cup ties, including the final. Fox Soccer Plus no longer foresees airing sports other than soccer. The Super League Grand Final airs on Fox Sports 2.

Rugby union

Major League Rugby
CBS, CBS Sports Network, and FS2 broadcast select games. All games are available free of charge on The Rugby Network

The Championship Final is broadcast on CBS.

Local television
Additionally, local or regional broadcasters contract with the MLR team in their area for the right to broadcast a number of regular season games locally, primarily on regional sports networks.

Premiership Rugby
NBC holds the rights to Premiership Rugby, the top division of the English rugby union system. NBC Sports also has the rights to the Six Nations Championship.

NBC Sports has rights to all World Rugby international events through 2023, including:
 2022 edition of the Rugby World Cup Sevens
 Both men's 2019 and 2023, plus women's 2021 editions of Rugby World Cup
 the annual World Rugby Under 20 Championship

Other international competitions/tournaments
The Rugby Championship: FloSports
Super Rugby: FloSports
European Rugby Champions Cup: FloSports 
European Rugby Challenge Cup: FloSports 
United Rugby Championship: FloSports
Test matches: FloSports

Rugby sevens 
 World Rugby Sevens Series: NBC Sports
 Premiership Rugby Sevens Series: FloSports
 Collegiate Rugby Championship: ESPN

Soccer

International competitions

Other international competitions/tournaments
FIFA Women's Club World Cup: Fox Sports (English), Telemundo Deportes (Spanish)
FIFA Futsal World Cup: Fox Sports (English), Telemundo Deportes (Spanish)
FIFA Women's Futsal World Cup: Fox Sports (English), Telemundo Deportes (Spanish)
FIFA Beach Soccer World Cup: Fox Sports (English), Telemundo Deportes (Spanish)
FIFA U-20 World Cup: Fox Sports (English), Telemundo Deportes (Spanish)
FIFA U-17 World Cup: Fox Sports (English), Telemundo Deportes (Spanish)
FIFA U-20 Women's World Cup: Fox Sports (English), Telemundo Deportes (Spanish)
FIFA U-17 Women's World Cup: Fox Sports (English), Telemundo Deportes (Spanish)
UEFA European Under-21 Championship: Fox Sports (English), Univision (Spanish)
UEFA European Under-21 Championship qualification: Rai Italia (Italy matches only), beIN Sports (France matches only)
UEFA European Under-19 Championship: Fox Sports (English), Univision (Spanish)
UEFA European Under-17 Championship: Fox Sports (English), Univision (Spanish)
UEFA Futsal Championship: Fox Sports (English), Univision (Spanish)
UEFA Under-19 Futsal Championship: Fox Sports, Univision (Spanish)
UEFA Women's Championship: Fox Sports (United States) (English), Univision (Spanish)
UEFA Women's Championship qualification: GOL TV (Netherlands matches only), beIN Sports (France matches only)
UEFA Women's Under-19 Championship: Fox Sports (English), Univision (Spanish)
UEFA Women's Under-17 Championship: Fox Sports (English), Univision (Spanish)
UEFA Women's Futsal Championship: UEFA.tv (English), Univision (Spanish)
UEFA Youth League: UEFA.tv (English)
UEFA Futsal Champions League: UEFA.tv (English)
CONCACAF Women's Championship: CBS Sports (English), Univision (Spanish)
CONCACAF W Gold Cup: CBS Sports (English), Univision (Spanish)
CONCACAF Men's Olympic Qualifying Tournament: Fox Sports (English), Univision (Spanish)
CONCACAF Women's Olympic Qualifying Tournament: Fox Sports (English), Univision (Spanish)
CONCACAF Futsal Championship: YouTube (English), Univision (Spanish)
CONCACAF Beach Soccer Championship: YouTube (English), Univision (Spanish)
CONCACAF Under-20 Championship: YouTube (English, group stage) and Fox Sports (English, knockout stage), Univision (Spanish)
CONCACAF Women's U-20 Championship: Fox Sports (English), Univision (Spanish through 2020)
CONCACAF Under-17 Championship: Fox Sports (English), Univision (Spanish through 2021)
CONCACAF Women's U-17 Championship: Fox Sports (English), Univision (Spanish through 2020)
Copa América Femenina: Fox Sports (English through 2026), Univision (Spanish through 2022)
CONMEBOL Pre-Olympic Tournament: Fox Sports (English through 2024), Univision (Spanish through 2024)
Copa América de Futsal: Fox Sports (English and Spanish through 2023)
Copa América de Beach Soccer: Fox Sports (English and Spanish through 2023)
South American Youth Football Championship: Fox Sports (English and Spanish through 2025)
South American U-20 Women's Championship: Fox Sports (English and Spanish)
South American U-17 Championship: Fox Sports (English and Spanish through 2025)
South American Under-17 Women's Football Championship: Fox Sports (English and Spanish)
CONMEBOL–UEFA Cup of Champions: Fox Sports (English), Univision (Spanish)
UEFA–CONMEBOL Women's Finalissima: Fox Sports (English), Univision (Spanish)
CONMEBOL–UEFA Youth Club Championship: Fox Sports (English), Univision (Spanish)
AFC Women's Asian Cup: CBS Sports (English through 2022)
AFC U-23 Asian Cup: YouTube (English for 2022 edition), CBS Sports (English for 2024 edition)
AFC Women's Olympic Qualifying Tournament: YouTube (English)
AFC U-20 Asian Cup: YouTube (English)
AFC U-20 Women's Asian Cup: YouTube (English)
AFC U-17 Asian Cup: YouTube (English)
AFC U-17 Women's Asian Cup: YouTube (English)
AFF Championship: YouTube (English)
SAFF Championship: Turner Sports (English)
EAFF E-1 Football Championship: Eleven Sports (English)
CAFA Championship: Eleven Sports (English)
WAFF Championship: Eleven Sports (English)
AFC Futsal Asian Cup: YouTube (English)
AFC U-20 Futsal Asian Cup: Eleven Sports (English)
AFC Beach Soccer Asian Cup: YouTube (English)
AFC Futsal Club Championship: YouTube (English)
AFC Women's Futsal Asian Cup: YouTube (English)
Africa Women Cup of Nations: beIN Sports (English)
CAF U-23 Championship: beIN Sports (English)
Africa Futsal Cup of Nations: beIN Sports (English)
OFC Men's Olympic Qualifying Tournament: Eleven Sports (English)
OFC Women's Nations Cup: Eleven Sports (English)
SheBelieves Cup: Turner Sports (English)
Arnold Clark Cup: CBS Sports (English)
Algarve Cup: YouTube (English)
FFA Cup of Nations: ESPN+ (English)
Tournoi de France: TV5Monde (French)
Florida Cup: beIN Sports (English)
The Women's Cup: CBS Sports (English)
Women's International Champions Cup: DAZN (English)
Toulon Tournament: beIN Sports (English)
Gothia Cup: Eleven Sports (English)
Generation Adidas Cup: YouTube and Twitch (English)

National teams
United States: Turner Sports has English language rights for men's and women's national team games starting in 2023 until 2030, with all games streaming on HBO Max and approximately half of the games also available on TNT. Spanish language rights are held by Telemundo Deportes on Telemundo, Universo and Peacock.
Canada: Fox Sports (English)
Mexico: TUDN (Spanish)
UEFA men's international friendlies: Fox Sports and FuboTV (English), Univision (Spanish)
Germany: YouTube (men's U-21 only)
Netherlands: GOL TV (English and Spanish) (women's national team only)
Italy: Rai Italia (Italian) (men's U-21 only)
France: beIN Sports (English and Spanish) (men's U-21 and women's national team only)

National competitions

Other national competitions
Liga de Expansión MX: TUDN (Spanish)
Liga MX Femenil: TUDN (Spanish)
Liga FPD Costa Rica: Centroamerica TV
Liga Nacional de Fútbol Profesional de Honduras: Centroamerica TV, Fox Deportes
Primera División de Fútbol de El Salvador: Centroamerica TV
Jamaica National Premier League: Island Sports Network
Campeonato Brasileiro Série A: Paramount+ (English), Rede Globo (Portuguese), ViX(Spanish), Fanatiz (English, Portuguese and Spanish)
Copa do Brasil: Fox Soccer Plus (English), Rede Globo (Portuguese)
Campeonato Paulista: Rede Globo (Portuguese)
Campeonato Carioca: Rede Globo (Portuguese)
Campeonato Brasileiro de Futebol Feminino Série A1: Eleven Sports
Primera División Argentina: Paramount+ (English), TyC Sports (Spanish), ViX (Spanish)
Categoría Primera A Colombia: RCN Nuestra Tele Internacional, ViX (Spanish) 
Uruguayan Primera División: GOL TV
Ecuadorian Serie A: GOL TV
Peruvian Primera División: Gol TV, ViX
Primeira Liga: GOL TV (English and Spanish)
Taça de Portugal: ESPN+ (English) (final only), RTP Internacional (Portuguese)
Supertaça Cândido de Oliveira: RTP Internacional (Portuguese)
Eredivisie: ESPN+
Dutch Cup: Gol TV (English and Spanish)
Belgian First Division A: ESPN+
Super League Greece: SportPlus TV, ANT1 Satellite
Russian Premier League: YouTube (subscription required)
Russian Super Cup: YouTube
Turkish Super Lig: beIN Sports
Scottish Professional Football League: CBS Sports/Paramount+
Scottish Cup: ESPN+
Scottish League Cup: CBS Sports/Paramount+
Scottish Challenge Cup: ESPN+
NIFL Premiership: OneFootball, Next Level Sports
League of Ireland: WatchLOI.ie
Allsvenskan: ESPN+ (1 match per week)
Swedish Cup: B/R Live (final only)
Damallsvenskan: Fanseat
Danish Superliga: OneFootball, Next Level Sports
Danish Cup: ESPN+
Eliteserien: OneFootball, Next Level Sports
Veikkausliiga: FloSports
Úrvalsdeild karla: OneFootball, Next Level Sports
Austrian Football Bundesliga: Next Level Sports
Austrian Cup: beIN Sports (final only)
Swiss Super League: OneFootball, Next Level Sports
Swiss Cup: B/R Live (final only), Cupplay.ch
Ekstraklasa: Ekstraklasa.tv, OneFootball, Next Level Sports
Polish Cup: B/R Live (final only)
Ukrainian Premier League: Eleven Sports Network
Slovak Super Liga: OneFootball, Next Level Sports
Latvian Higher League: OneFootball, Next Level Sports
Kazakhstan Premier League: OneFootball, Next Level Sports
Euro Beach Soccer League: ESPN+
A-League Men: YouTube
A-League Women: YouTube
Australia Cup: ESPN+
J.League: YouTube
K League 1: KLeague TV
Indian Super League: OneFootball
Uzbekistan Super League: Eleven Sports
New Zealand National League: YouTube
Chatham Cup: YouTube
New Zealand Women's National League: YouTube
Kate Sheppard Cup: YouTube

Swimming

NBC Sports has rights to the following events with coverage varying on NBC and USA Network

 FINA World Aquatics Championships
 Pan Pacific Swimming Championships
 United States Swimming National Championships

Tennis
Australian Open
 ESPN and Tennis Channel have the contracts through 2031. Coverage is aired on ESPN, ESPN2, ESPN+, ESPN3, and Tennis Channel.
French Open
 NBC Sports and Tennis Channel have the contracts through 2024. Coverage is aired on NBC, USA Network, Peacock, and Tennis Channel.
 Tennis Channel shows live coverage in the morning and afternoon on weekdays. NBC shows weekend morning and Memorial Day early round matches in the afternoon via broadcast delay. If a match is still being played, it will be shown live. Tennis Channel cannot show NBC's tape delayed matches. NBC also airs one women's semi-final and one men's semi-final, broadcasting live in the Eastern Time Zone, delayed in all other time zones. USA Network also broadcasts the second men's semi-final, live in all time zones. NBC broadcasts both finals live, and USA Network broadcasts the women's doubles final live. Starting in 2021, Peacock will show weekend afternoon matches.
The Championships, Wimbledon
 ESPN has the contract through 2035. ABC airs live matches during the middle weekend beginning in 2022. Tennis Channel has rights to daily highlights through 2036 also provides coverage. Coverage is as follows:
 Qualifying: ESPN+
 Days 1–6: ESPN, ESPN+, and ESPN3
 Day 7: ESPN, ESPN2, ESPN+, and ESPN3
 Days 8 and 9: ESPN, ESPN2, ESPN+ and ESPN3
 Days 10–13 including the ladies' and gentlemen's singles finals: ESPN, ESPN+ and ESPN3
 Same-day replays are aired on Tennis Channel throughout the tournament through 2023. Live matches of the middle weekend air on ABC beginning in 2022. Same-day replays of the ladies' and gentlemen's singles finals are aired on ABC.
U.S. Open
 ESPN has the contract through 2025. Tennis Channel also provides coverage. Coverage is as follows:
 Arthur Ashe Kids' Day: ABC
 Days 1–5: ESPN, ESPN2, ESPN3, and ESPN+
 Days 6–8: ESPN2, ESPN3, and ESPN+
 Days 9–10: ESPN, ESPN2, ESPN3, and ESPN+
 Day 11: women's singles semifinals: ESPN
 Day 12: mixed doubles final: ESPN2, men's singles semifinals: ESPN
 Day 13: men's doubles final: ESPN3, women's singles final: ESPN
 Day 14: women's doubles final: ESPN3, men's singles final: ESPN
 A daily preview show, same-day highlights and a daily wrap-up show are aired on Tennis Channel throughout the tournament.
ATP Finals
Tennis Channel

ATP Tour Masters 1000
 Tennis Channel, Starting 2021.
ATP Tour 500
 Tennis Channel
ATP Tour 250
 Tennis Channel

WTA Finals
 Tennis Channel
WTA Premier tournaments
 ESPN (Indian Wells, Miami, Cincinnati and San Jose)
 Tennis Channel (Except San Jose)
WTA International tournaments
 Tennis Channel
Davis Cup
CBS Sports (qualifiers, from 2020)
Fox Sports (finals, from 2019)

Billie Jean King Cup
 Tennis Channel
US Open Series
 ESPN2 and ESPN3
Laver Cup
 ESPN3 and Tennis Channel
World TeamTennis
 ESPN2 (final only) and ESPN3
Tie Break Tens
 ESPN3

Track and field (athletics)
NBCUniversal holds rights to the following:
 World Athletics Championships
 World Athletics Indoor Championships
 World Athletics Cross Country Championships
 World Athletics U20 Championships
 Diamond League
 World Athletics Relays
 USA Outdoor Track and Field Championships
 USA Track & Field Indoor Championships
 United States Olympic Trials

Winter sports

U.S. Figure Skating Championships: NBC
Alpine Skiing: NBC Sports
Bobsledding: NBC Sports
Burton US Open Snowboarding Championships: Fox Sports

Miscellaneous

 X Games: ESPN and Facebook/YouTube
 Dew Tour: NBCSN and website
 World Weightlifting Championships: ESPN3
 International Swimming League: ESPN3
 Boston Marathon: ESPN
 New York City Marathon: ESPN
 New York City Half Marathon: ESPN3
 London Marathon: FloSports
 Paris Marathon: Peacock
 Houston Marathon: ESPN3
 World Series of Poker: PokerGO/CBS Sports
 World Table Tennis Championships: ESPN3
 World Championship of Ping Pong:  DAZN
 European Champions League (table tennis): ESPN3
 Table Tennis World Cup: ESPN3
 ITTF World Tour: ESPN3
 Asian Cup Table Tennis Tournament: ESPN3
 European Badminton Championships: ESPN3
Professional Darts Corporation:
PDC World Darts Championship: DAZN
PDC World Cup of Darts: DAZN
Premier League Darts: DAZN
UK Open: DAZN
 Professional Bowlers Association: Fox Sports
 Kabaddi World Cup: ESPN3
 Kabaddi Masters: ESPN3
 Mosconi Cup: ESPN3
 Scripps National Spelling Bee: Bounce TV, Ion Television
 America's Cup: NBCSN
 FIVB Volleyball Men's Nations League and FIVB Volleyball Women's Nations League: CBSSN
 Association of Volleyball Professionals: NBCSN
 NCAA Beach Volleyball Championship: ESPNU ESPN2 ESPN
 USA Volleyball College Beach Championship: NBCSN Olympic Channel
 World Men's Handball Championship: beIN Sports
 European Men's Handball Championship: beIN Sports
 Professional Bull Riders: CBS and CBS Sports
 Australian Football League: Fox Soccer Plus, Fox Sports 2, and WatchAFL
 AFL Women's: WatchAFL
 USA Ultimate College Championships and Triple Crown Tour: ESPNU and ESPN3
 Super League Triathlon: ESPN3
 World Equestrian Games: NBC
 Wrestling World Cup and World Wrestling Championships: FloSports
 Olympic sports: Olympic Channel
 Association of Pickleball Professionals: ESPN, ESPN+, CBS Sports Network

References

 
United States